Fractionation Research Inc. (FRI) is an industry cooperative organization that researches the performance of  industrial-scale mass transfer devices such as trays, packings and other column internals. Its objective is to facilitate the design of more economical distillation, absorption and stripping systems. Before the formation of FRI, such research was performed on a small scale by universities or private companies. The latter controlled their results as proprietary information, generally inaccessible by competitors.

History
FRI is a non-profit organization formed by petroleum, chemical and engineering companies to perform plant-scale research in distillation. It began in 1952, spearheaded by Dr. Karl Hachmuth and T. B. Hudson of Phillips Petroleum Company in Bartlesville, Oklahoma. Hachmuth was noted for his research into the design of mass transfer equipment, He realized that the effort required would be beyond the resources of a single company, and proposed the formation of a cooperative organization to pursue this work. Hudson became the first president of FRI. In 1954, FRI contracted to use a simulation facility at the headquarters of C. F. Braun & Co. in Alhambra, California. Operations continued at Alhambra until 1989, when Braun was acquired by Halliburton, Inc., and merged into its Brown & Root subsidiary (now KBR). FRI then moved its facilities to Oklahoma State University (OSU) at Stillwater, Oklahoma in 1991. 
FRI initially planned a five-year research program. However, the board of directors has voted extensions until the present.

Research scope
FRI has tested various types of fractionation trays and packings (both generic and proprietary designs), with the objective of developing correlations for predicting tray efficiencies and  pressure drops. This information is needed to design fractionators, absorbers and strippers. It has also tested performance of other column internals such as liquid distributors. It periodically reports its findings to the member companies.

The OSU library  maintains an unrestricted collection of FRI progress reports, plant tests, topical reports, consultants’ reports and annual reports that were issued during the period 1954 – 1970. 
FRI has also produced a number of unrestricted instructional films and videos, which are listed on its home page. These are available to non-members.

Membership
Initially, fifteen companies signed agreements with FRI and grew to 37 by the first stockholder meeting in November 1952. Membership continued to grow to a peak of  94 companies in 1995. Membership declined thereafter to 67 in 2008, primarily due to mergers. At first, nearly all members were U. S. companies; but by 2008 a majority of the members were not based in the U. S.

Organization
Each member company is entitled to put one representative on the board of directors. The Board then elects an executive committee that directs the detailed business through the President and the Secretary of the company. The president is elected by the board of directors.

A Technical Advisory Committee, which also has one representative from each member company, oversees the research program. This committee elects a chairman and a smaller Technical Committee. The Technical Committee works with the FRI Technical Director (a full-time employee of FRI) to execute the research projects performed by the staff. Full-time staff currently includes eight technicians and six chemical engineers.

References

Research institutes established in 1952
Engineering companies of the United States
Chemical engineering organizations
Distillation
Fractionation
1952 establishments in Oklahoma